Sherman County is one of the 36 counties in the U.S. state of Oregon. As of the 2020 census, the population was 1,870, making it the second-least populous county in Oregon after nearby Wheeler. The county seat is Moro, and the largest city is Wasco. The county is named for William Tecumseh Sherman, a Union general in the American Civil War.

History

As the pioneers felt crowded in the new settlements of western Oregon, they turned east to the Columbia Plateau for new opportunities. The county's first white settler was William Graham, who located at the mouth of the Deschutes River in 1858. Homesteaders, eager for land, arrived in the 1880s by steamboat, stagecoach and wagon. Soon farmers received government patents.

As the population grew, so did the sentiment for independence from Wasco County. Sherman County was created on February 25, 1889, out of the northeast corner of Wasco County. The county's borders have been changed only once, in 1891, when the Legislative Assembly moved the county line  farther south into Wasco County.

The town of Wasco was designated the county seat by the Legislative Assembly although this designation was contested between Wasco and Moro. Following the addition of a portion of Wasco County, Moro became the eventual winner.

Geography
Sherman County is located in the central northern part of Oregon, east of the Cascade Range. It lies between the John Day River to the east and the Deschutes River to the west, which defines the borders of the county. On the northern border of the county is the Colombia River. Sherman County is mostly flat, being part of the Colombia Platea, it's highest point is at an unknown location at 3,004 feet (916m).

Adjacent counties
 Klickitat County, Washington - north
 Gilliam County - east
 Wasco County - southwest

Demographics

2000 census
As of the census of 2000, there were 1,934 people, 797 households, and 545 families living in the county.  The population density was 2 (2,3) people per square mile (1/km2).  There were 935 housing units at an average density of 1 per square mile (0/km2).  The racial makeup of the county was 93.59% White, 0.21% Black or African American, 1.40% Native American, 0.47% Asian, 2.79% from other races, and 1.55% from two or more races.  4.86% of the population were Hispanic or Latino of any race. 20.5% were of German, 17.3% American, 11.7% English, 8.7% Irish and 5.3% Norwegian ancestry.

There were 797 households, out of which 29.90% had children under the age of 18 living with them, 58.50% were married couples living together, 6.50% had a female householder with no husband present, and 31.50% were non-families. 28.70% of all households were made up of individuals, and 14.10% had someone living alone who was 65 years of age or older.  The average household size was 2.43 and the average family size was 2.97.

In the county, the population was spread out, with 26.40% under the age of 18, 5.80% from 18 to 24, 23.40% from 25 to 44, 26.10% from 45 to 64, and 18.30% who were 65 years of age or older.  The median age was 42 years. For every 100 females there were 102.90 males.  For every 100 females age 18 and over, there were 105.00 males.

The median income for a household in the county was $35,142, and the median income for a family was $42,563. Males had a median income of $31,207 versus $21,579 for females. The per capita income for the county was $17,448.  About 12.30% of families and 14.60% of the population were below the poverty line, including 20.20% of those under age 18 and 7.70% of those age 65 or over.

2010 census
As of the 2010 census, there were 1,765 people, 777 households, and 492 families living in the county. The racial makeup of the county was 93.4% white, 1.6% American Indian, 0.2% black or African American, 0.2% Asian, 0.1% Pacific islander, 2.7% from other races, and 1.8% from two or more races. Those of Hispanic or Latino origin made up 5.6% of the population. In terms of ancestry, 22.6% were German, 16.5% were English, 13.0% were Irish, and 4.9% were American.

Of the 777 households, 23.0% had children under the age of 18 living with them, 51.2% were married couples living together, 7.5% had a female householder with no husband present, 36.7% were non-families, and 30.5% of all households were made up of individuals. The average household size was 2.27 and the average family size was 2.84. The median age was 48.2 years.

The median income for a household in the county was $41,354 and the median income for a family was $52,361. Males had a median income of $42,768 versus $32,386 for females. The per capita income for the county was $21,688. About 13.9% of families and 20.0% of the population were below the poverty line, including 38.2% of those under age 18 and 9.9% of those age 65 or over.

Government and infrastructure
The Northern Oregon Regional Corrections Facility (Norcor), a short-term jail, serves Sherman, Gilliam, Hood River, and Wasco counties. Although Sherman County is located in Central Oregon, its politics are more-aligned with the eastern parts of the state with most of its voters being affiliated with the Republican Party. No Democrat has carried this county in a presidential election since Lyndon Johnson in 1964. The last time a Democrat had won over 400 votes here was in 1996 with Bill Clinton, who lost the county to Bob Dole by a margin of 32 votes.

Economy
Sherman County is predominantly an agricultural county, its economy receiving some aid from ranching and tourism. Its farms primarily produce wheat and barley.  It is also home to the Biglow Canyon Wind Farm, the largest project of its kind in Oregon.

Communities

Cities
 Grass Valley
 Moro (county seat)
 Rufus
 Wasco

Census-designated place
 Biggs Junction

Other unincorporated communities

 De Moss Springs
 Erskine
 Harmony
 Kent
 Klondike
 Locust Grove
 McDonald
 Monkland
 Rutledge

See also

 National Register of Historic Places listings in Sherman County, Oregon

Footnotes

Further reading
 Giles French, The Golden land : a history of Sherman County, Oregon.Portland, OR: Champoeg Press, 1958.
 Sherman County Historical Society, A Guide to Oregon Trails in Sherman County, Oregon. Moro, OR: Sherman County Historical Society, 1993.
 An Illustrated History of Central Oregon, Embracing Wasco, Sherman, Gilliam, Wheeler, Crook, Lake, and Klamath Counties, State of Oregon. Spokane, WA: Western Historical Publishing Co., 1905.

Newspapers
 Current - The Times-Journal
Moro Bulletin.
 Moro Leader. (1898— )
 Moro Observer/Sherman County Observer. (1897—1931)
 Sherman County Journal. (1931— )
 Sherman County News. (1927— )

 
1889 establishments in Oregon
Populated places established in 1889
Columbia River Gorge